Nukabira Dam  is a gravity dam located in Hokkaido Prefecture in Japan. The dam is used for power production. The catchment area of the dam is 387.8 km2. The dam impounds about 822  ha of land when full and can store 193900 thousand cubic meters of water. The construction of the dam was started on 1953 and completed in 1956.

References

Dams in Hokkaido